Puycapel is a commune in the Cantal department in south-central France. It was established on 1 January 2019 by merger of the former communes of Calvinet and Mourjou.

See also
Communes of the Cantal department

References

Communes of Cantal
2019 establishments in France
Populated places established in 2019